Provincial road N310 (N310) is a road connecting N309 in Elburg with N224 near Oosterbeek.

External links

310
310